Davi Rodrigues de Jesus or simply Davi (born 6 April 1984 in Gravataí) is a Brazilian midfielder. Who currently plays for Nei Mongol Zhongyou in the China League One.

Career
David started in the youth of Paulista de Jundiaí, and later transferred to St. Paulo, but not received recognition at the club in São Paulo. Then migrated to a number of times and was successful in using Bragantino jersey number 10.

In 2009 came to Avai's cast to play the Championship season of Santa Catarina and the Brazilian championship Serie A, but before I play the Brasileirão, was on loan with the Paraná.

For the 2010 season, returned to Avai. Even before David's work in years by the club of Santa Catarina, a survey of Coritiba appeared to have the athlete in your squad, a fact belied by the player who guaranteed the season meet in the Lion Island.

Davi previously played for São Paulo in the Campeonato Brasileiro Série A and has played for Albirex Niigata in the J1 League.

On 8 January 2015, Davi transferred to fellow Chinese Super League side Shanghai SIPG.

In May 2016, Davi signed for China League One side Shanghai Shenxin.

References

External links
 

1984 births
Living people
Brazilian footballers
Brazilian expatriate footballers
Avaí FC players
Clube Atlético Bragantino players
São Paulo FC players
Coritiba Foot Ball Club players
Esporte Clube São Bento players
Paraná Clube players
Albirex Niigata players
Guangzhou City F.C. players
Shanghai Port F.C. players
Shanghai Shenxin F.C. players
Inner Mongolia Zhongyou F.C. players
Campeonato Brasileiro Série A players
J1 League players
Chinese Super League players
China League One players
Brazilian expatriate sportspeople in Japan
Expatriate footballers in Japan
Brazilian expatriate sportspeople in China
Expatriate footballers in China
Association football forwards